Norbert Wagner (born 23 October 1935) was a German sailor who competed in the 1972 Summer Olympics.

References

1935 births
Living people
German male sailors (sport)
Olympic sailors of West Germany
Sailors at the 1972 Summer Olympics – Soling
Place of birth missing (living people)